Rybno  is a village in Sochaczew County, Masovian Voivodeship, in east-central Poland. It is the seat of the gmina (administrative district) called Gmina Rybno.

The village has a population of 630.

External links
 Jewish Community in Rybno on Virtual Shtetl

References

Rybno